Syngrapha sackenii is a moth of the family Noctuidae. It is found in the Rocky Mountains from south-western Montana to north-eastern Utah, New Mexico and Colorado.

External links
Images

Plusiinae
Moths of North America
Moths described in 1877